International Orchestra Safari Sound (sometimes shortened to IOSS) was a popular muziki wa dansi Tanzanian band from 1985 to 1992.

History
The band was founded by Tanzanian businessman Hugo Kisima, who also owned another popular dansi band, the Orchestra Safari Sound. In 1985 he decided to disband Orchestra Safari Sound and create a new ensemble with talented musicians hired from major dansi bands such as Mlimani Park. Kisima chose singer Muhiddin Maalin Gurumo, guitarist Abel Balthazar, and singer-songwriter Hassani Bitchuka as the leaders of the new band.

The major mtindo (style) popularized by IOSS was ndekule, a word that is both a reference to traditional Tanzanian war dances and to a species of snakes. The snake thus became the icon of the band.

In the 1980s IOSS and Mlimani Park dominated the dansi scene. This came to an end between 1987 and 1989 when Bitchuka and Maalim left. In the early 1990s a new entry in the band's personnel, guitarist Nguza Mbangu (formerly Orchestra Maquis Original) revitalized IOSS for a while; Mbangu established a new mtindo, rashikanda wasaa, and wrote a big hit song, Mageuzi. Despite this, Kisima decided to disband the band in 1992.

References
 IOSS and other dansi bands

Tanzanian musical groups